Pen-y-groes is an electoral ward within the Carmarthenshire County Council, representing the people of Penygroes, Carmarthenshire, Wales.

Profile
In 2019, the Pen-y-groes electoral ward had an electorate of 2,361. As of 2021 the population was 2,917, of whom 2,311 were born in Wales. 62.2% of the population are able to speak Welsh.

Current Representation
The Pen-y-groes Ward is a single-member ward, meaning only one representative is elected at each election. Since 2017 it has been represented by Plaid Cymru councillor Dai Thomas.

Electoral History
The first election to the new unitary Carmarthenshire County Council took place in 1995. Ceirwyn Davies was elected with a majority of just 54 votes.

References

Carmarthenshire electoral wards